West Town or Westtown may refer to any of the following places.

United Kingdom
West Town, Peterborough in Cambridgeshire
West Town, Hayling Island in Hampshire
West Town, Backwell in North Somerset

United States
West Town, Chicago in Illinois
Westtown, New York, a hamlet
Westtown Township, Chester County, Pennsylvania
West Town Mall in Knoxville, Tennessee

See also
West Towne Mall in Madison, Wisconsin
Westtown School in West Chester, Pennsylvania